Bekesbourne railway station is on the Dover branch of the Chatham Main Line in England, and serves the villages of Bekesbourne and Patrixbourne, Kent.

The station and all trains that serve the station are operated by Southeastern.

The station and the line it serves were built by the London, Chatham & Dover Railway and opened on 22 July 1861. The platforms are linked by a footbridge. The country-bound platform is accessible by public footpath. Nearby is a viaduct over the Nailbourne Stream, a tributary of the River Stour.

Facilities
Bekesbourne station is unstaffed and facilities are limited. Tickets can be purchased from the self-service ticket machine at the station and there are passenger help points located on each platforms. There is also a basic shelter located on each platform.

There is also a small chargeable car park located at the station, operated by Saba Parking.

Step-free access is available to both of the platforms at Bekesbourne.

Services
All services at Bekesbourne are operated by Southeastern using  EMUs.

The typical off-peak service in trains per hour is:
 1 tph to  via 
 1 tph to 

During the peak hours, the service is increased to 2 tph.

References

External links

City of Canterbury
Railway stations in Kent
DfT Category F2 stations
Former London, Chatham and Dover Railway stations
Railway stations in Great Britain opened in 1861
Railway stations served by Southeastern
1861 establishments in England